Colin Campbell McLatchie (c. 1878 – 7 January 1952) was a Scottish footballer who played for Sunderland as a winger. He made his Sunderland debut on 5 November 1898 against Wolverhampton Wanderers in a 2–0 defeat at the Molineux Stadium. He won the 1902 English Football League Championship while with Sunderland. In total, he made 121 league appearances and scored 31 goals. McLatchie later played with Grimsby Town and Preston North End.

References
Colin McLatchie's careers stats at The Stat Cat

1870s births
1952 deaths
Scottish footballers
Sunderland A.F.C. players
Grimsby Town F.C. players
Preston North End F.C. players
English Football League players
Association football wingers